Richard Salter (born 1979, West Yorkshire, England) is a British artist who is currently serving with in the Royal Corps of Signals, British Army.

Richard Salter

Life and work
Salter has a BA (Hons) in fine art. He was born in West Yorkshire. He has served 21 years in the British Army and was medically discharged in 2017. He held his first solo exhibition in Dorset in 2008, and has since painted celebrities, used actors as models, featured in Art magazines and won various awards. His work can be found in www.gallery21.co.uk based in Salisbury and he has exhibited in the Mall Galleries, London with the Armed Forces Art Society and in Salisbury with the Army Art Society.

He has more recently exhibited work in Tate Britain and also was a finalist on the BBC's Big Painting Challenge.

Awards

 2016 National Army Museum Award
 2015 First Prize AAS, presented by Royal Academician Emma Stibbon
 2015 Finalist, BBC's Big Painting Challenge
 2013 War Artist of the Year RU
 2013 Best in Show RU Army Arts Exhibition, Salisbury
 2012 Armed Forces Art Society Award
 2011 National Army Museum Templar Award for "Operator" painting

Collectors
 National Army Museum, London
 Kohima Museum, York
 Private Collections

References

External links
 Salisbury Journal - September 2014
 BBC Radio York Interview - 25 January 2014
 BBC Look North Televised Exhibition - 24 January 2014
 Soldier Magazine - December 2013
 Sunday Telegraph – 14 July 2013
 York Press 
 York Press - 9 May 2013
 Artists & Illustrators - 12 July 2013

1979 births
Living people
Military personnel from Yorkshire
People from Devizes
People from West Yorkshire
Artists from Yorkshire
Royal Corps of Signals officers